The Netherlands was represented by Sandra Reemer, with the song "The Party's Over", at the 1976 Eurovision Song Contest, which took place on 3 April in The Hague, following Teach-In's victory for the Netherlands the previous year. The song was the winner of the Dutch national final for the contest, held on 18 February. This was the second of Reemer's three Eurovision appearances for the Netherlands: she had sung in the 1972 contest in a duo with Dries Holten (Andres), and would also take part in the 1979 contest under the name of Xandra.

Prior to the contest, there was controversy when some other national delegations laid accusations that "The Party's Over" plagiarised the 1968 Mary Hopkin hit "Those Were the Days". The allegations of plagiarism were considered and rejected by contest organisers the European Broadcasting Union, who conceded that the songs were very similar in style and structure, but did not find any similarity between the actual melodies.

Before Eurovision

Nationaal Songfestival 1976 
The final was held at the Congresgebouw in The Hague (the same venue where the Eurovision final was to take place) on 18 February 1976, hosted by Willem Duys.

Five songs took part, with the winner being decided by eleven regional juries who each had 10 points to allocate between the songs. All the acts were well-known hitmakers in the Netherlands, and an extra point of interest for viewers was that one of the other participants was Reemer's former singing partner Holten, now performing with his new partner Rosy: reportedly by 1976 Reemer and Holten were no longer on the best of terms, so there was much anticipation to see them competing against each other. In the event, "The Party's Over" emerged the winner while Holten's song "I Was Born to Love" could only manage fourth place.

At Eurovision 
On the night of the final Reemer performed 8th in the running order, following Ireland and preceding Norway. At the close of voting "The Party's Over" had received 56 points from 14 countries, placing the Netherlands 9th of the 18 entries. The Dutch jury awarded its 12 points to France.

The Dutch conductor at the contest was Harry van Hoof.

Voting

References

External links 
 Dutch Preselection 1976

1976
Countries in the Eurovision Song Contest 1976
Eurovision